Bria Williams (born 1 July 1995) is a footballer who plays as a defender. Raised in Canada, she represented the Guyana women's national team.

Club career
In 2016 and 2017, she played for Vaughan Azzurri in League1 Ontario.

International goals
Scores and results list Guyana's goal tally first

See also
List of Guyana women's international footballers

References

1995 births
Living people
Women's association football defenders
Guyanese women's footballers
Guyana women's international footballers
Canadian women's soccer players
Soccer players from Mississauga
Black Canadian women's soccer players
Canadian sportspeople of Guyanese descent
York Lions soccer players
Vaughan Azzurri (women) players
League1 Ontario (women) players